The 1992 Nigerian Senate election in Taraba State was held on July 4, 1992, to elect members of the Nigerian Senate to represent Taraba State. Abdullahi Kirim representing Taraba North, Ibrahim Goje representing Taraba Central and Utisere Joshua Yohanna representing Taraba South all won on the platform of the Social Democratic Party.

Overview

Summary

Results

Taraba North 
The election was won by Abdullahi Kirim of the Social Democratic Party.

Taraba Central 
The election was won by Ibrahim Goje of the Social Democratic Party.

Taraba South 
The election was won by Utisere Joshua Yohanna of the Social Democratic Party.

References 

Tar
Taraba State Senate elections
July 1992 events in Nigeria